Reid is a northern suburb of Adelaide, South Australia in the Town of Gawler. It is a sliver of land bounded by the Gawler bypass road, the Gawler River, and the Gawler-Roseworthy railway line.

Reid was excised from Gawler West in 2004 in response to a petition by residents who felt that a different name would make it easier to find their area. It is named after a Mr Reid who was an early landholder in the area.

References

Suburbs of Adelaide